Neuhaus (German for "new house") may refer to:

Places 

in Germany:
in Bavaria:
Neuhaus an der Pegnitz, in the district Nürnberger Land
Neuhaus am Inn, in the district of Passau
in Lower Saxony:
Amt Neuhaus, in the district of Lüneburg
Neuhaus (Oste), in the district of Cuxhaven
in North Rhine-Westphalia:
in Thuringia:
Neuhaus am Rennweg, in the district of Sonneberg
Neuhaus-Schierschnitz, in the district of Sonneberg
in Saarland:

in Austria:
Neuhaus, Carinthia, in the district of Völkermarkt, Carinthia
Neuhaus am Klausenbach, in the district of Jennersdorf, Burgenland
in Switzerland:
Neuhaus, Bern, in the municipality of Unterseen in the canton of Bern
Neuhaus, Fribourg, in the canton of Fribourg

in the Czech Republic:
Jindřichův Hradec (in German: Neuhaus), in the district of Jindřichův Hradec, South Bohemian Region

Other uses 
 Neuhaus (surname)

 Chocolatier Neuhaus
 Lodge Neuhaus 946
is a Masonic Lodge which meets in Paderborn and is part of the Grand Lodge of British Freemasons in Germany.

See also 
 Neuhausen (disambiguation)
 Neuhauser (disambiguation)
 Newhouse (disambiguation)